Iavonomby Vohibola  is a town and commune in Madagascar. It belongs to the Isandra district, which is a part of Haute Matsiatra Region. The population of the commune was 11,526 in 2018.

Only primary schooling is available. The majority 98% of the population of the commune are farmers, while an additional 0.7% receives their livelihood from raising livestock. The most important crop is rice, while other important products are cassava, sweet potatoes and potatoes. Services provide employment for 0.3% of the population. Additionally fishing employs 1% of the population.

References

Populated places in Haute Matsiatra